Narendra Kumar  Kashyap is a politician from Bharatiya Janata Party. He was a Bahujan Samaj Party Member of the Parliament of India representing Uttar Pradesh in the Rajya Sabha, the upper house of the Indian Parliament.

He has studied BA and LLB and is Advocate by profession.

Now currently he is on bail for his daughter in law's dowry harassment and dowry death case.

References

Living people
Bahujan Samaj Party politicians from Uttar Pradesh
Rajya Sabha members from Uttar Pradesh
1963 births
People from Ghaziabad district, India
Indian prisoners and detainees